Jiangxi Isuzu Motors Co., Ltd.  is a joint venture between Isuzu and Jiangling Motors Corporation Group (JMCG). The venture is headquartered in Nanchang, Jiangxi province. It is focused on the production and sale of Isuzu pickups and their engines for the Chinese market.

History
The first joint venture between Isuzu and Jiangxi Automotive Manufacturing Plant (which would later be renamed JMCG) was established in March 1983. Isuzu N-series trucks were manufactured from 1985 onwards. In 1993, when Jiangling Motors Corporation was spun off from JMCG, Jiangxi Automobile Manufacturing Co., Ltd. (a JMCG subsidiary), Itochu Trading and Isuzu created the Jiangling Isuzu joint venture to continue producing Isuzu-badged trucks for 20 years. JMCG owned a 75% stake and the rest was evenly distributed between Isuzu and Itochu. JMCG and Isuzu restructured their agreement in 2012, and the equally-owned Jiangxi Isuzu took charge of Isuzu production in April 2013.

The first vehicle product of the new Jiangxi Isuzu venture, the Isuzu D-Max was launched on 7 December 2014 by Jiangxi Isuzu. The engine used is the 4JK1 2.5L diesel with 5 Speed Manual/Automatic transmission in 2WD and 4WD models.

Models

D-Max

The Isuzu D-Max pickup truck, offered in many markets, is also manufactured in China.

Lingtuo
The Lingtuo resembles the D-Max, but is cheaper.

Ruimai and Ruimai S
Unlike the two models described above, the Ruimai (or Remax) wears the logo of JIM (Jiangxi Isuzu Motors), not of Isuzu. Besides the ICE versions, an all-electric version is also offered.

A restyled variant known as the Ruimai S was unveiled in 2019.

MU-X
The Isuzu MU-X was also produced in China by Jiangxi Isuzu.

References

External links

 

Truck manufacturers of China
Isuzu
Jiangling Motors Corporation Group